Pencaitland railway station served the village of Pencaitland, East Lothian, Scotland, from 1901 to 1933 on the Macmerry Branch.

History 
The station was opened on 14 October 1901 by the North British Railway. To the north was a goods yard, its two sidings and to the west was a railway cottage. The station closed on 3 April 1933.

References 

Disused railway stations in East Lothian
Former North British Railway stations
Railway stations in Great Britain opened in 1901
Railway stations in Great Britain closed in 1933
1901 establishments in Scotland
1933 disestablishments in Scotland